Liberian Americans are an ethnic group of  Americans of full or partial Liberian ancestry. This can include Liberians who are descendants of Americo-Liberian people in America. The first wave of Liberians to the United States, after the slavery period, was after of the First Liberian Civil War in the 1990s and, then, after the Second Liberian Civil War in the early 2000s.

An estimated 100,000 Liberians live in the U.S. as of this time. The diplomatic relationship between Liberia and the USA goes back over 200 years to Liberia's foundation by returning African slaves freed by abolitionist societies which set aside land for the freedmen and paved the way to its independence.

History

The first Liberians in the United States 
The first people that emigrated to the United States from the regions that currently form Liberia were slaves imported between the 17th and 19th centuries. Thus, many individuals can trace backgrounds to groups such as the Kpelle, Kru, Gola, and, perhaps, the Gio,  Grebo, Bassa, Vai  and Mandingo. Many of them were imported by Virginia, South Carolina and Georgia planters.  The children of some of these slaves gained some notability in the United States, as was the case of  abolitionist, journalist, physician, and writer Martin Delany (1812 – 1885), arguably the first proponent of American black nationalism and  the first African-American field officer in the United States Army during the American Civil War.

Between 1822 and the second half of the 19th century, especially with the abolition of slavery in the United States in the 1860s, many slaves returned to Africa, settling in West Africa and founding Liberia (inhabiting regions already populated). Liberian migration to the United States did not resume again until the first half of the 20th century when the first Liberians went to the United States. However, only several hundred of Liberians immigrated to the United States, a very small number compared with the people who emigrated from Europe, Asia and Latin America. In the 1950s and 1960s only a few hundred Liberian migrated to the United States (232 and 569 respectively). It was not until the 1970s when there was a considerable immigration from Liberia, which amounted to 2081 people. This low immigration was due to the fact that Liberia was one of the most stable democracies and prosperous economies in Africa up until the military coup in 1980.

First Liberian Civil War 
During the 20th century few Liberian emigrated to United States; most who did were students. However, during the First Liberian Civil War (1989–96), thousands of Liberians emigrated to the United States. From 1990 through 1997, the INS reported that 13,458 Liberians fled to the United States and lived there permanently. During these years, there were also tens of thousands who sought temporary refuge in the United States. In 1991 alone, the INS guaranteed Temporary Protective Status (TPS) to approximately 9,000 Liberians in the United States.
After the war, another 6,000 Liberians moved to Providence, Rhode Island. About 10,000 other Liberians settled across the U.S. and most of them decided to stay after the war ended. Although the INS revoked the TPS status in 1997 following national elections in Liberia, many of these Liberian Americans refused return to Liberia. In 1999, the U.S. Congress decided to give the Liberian refugees permanent status in the United States.

Second Liberian Civil War 
After the Second Liberian Civil War (1999-2003), large numbers of Liberians settled in Rhode Island, Staten Island, Philadelphia, Virginia, Georgia and Minnesota. By 2010, Liberians established another sizable community in California, primarily in West Los Angeles and the Bay Area (San Francisco and Oakland).

Demography 

Liberian American organizations estimate there are between 250,000 and 500,000 Liberians living in the United States. This figure includes Liberian residents  that have a temporary status, and American of Liberian descent.

As of 2017, an estimated 4,700 Liberian-Americans live in the Fargo, North Dakota area. Other cities with large Liberian populations include Brooklyn Park, MN, Minneapolis, MN, St. Paul, MN, Brooklyn Center, MN Providence, RI, Pawtucket, RI, Staten Island, NY,  the Bronx, NY. Newark, NJ   Trenton, NJ,  Morrisville, PA, Southwest Philadelphia, Darby, PA, Upper Darby, PA, Folcroft, PA, Sharon Hill, PA, Baltimore, MD, Silver Spring, MD, Gaithersburg, MD, Johnson City, TN, Charlotte, NC, Lawrenceville, GA, Jacksonville, FL, Des Moines, IA, Sioux Falls, SD, Columbus, OH, Fort Worth, TX, and Phoenix, AZ.

Many Liberians have formed families in United States.  However, some still vow to return to their country once the political and social situation stabilizes,  which, according to the president of the Union of Liberian Associations in the Americas, Joseph D. Z. Korto, seems unlikely to happen in a "near future."

Language and culture 
While there is a variety of languages spoken in Liberia (where English is the official language of the country), the majority of Liberians in the United States speak Standard English as well as the Liberian Kreyol language also known as Kolokwa which serves as a lingua franca among Liberians of different ethnic groups. The Kru languages such as Bassa, Kru (of the same name) and Krahn are the most widely spoken Liberian native dialects in the United States as well as Kpelle and Mandingo, both Mande languages. Another language spoken by some Liberian Americans is Gullah, a Creole language, though this language is spoken primarily by the descendants of slaves brought from Sierra Leone, Liberia, and Guinea, and not by recent immigrants.  It is spoken by a small group of people in the Carolina Sea Islands and the mid-Atlantic coast of the United States.

85.6% of Liberians are Christians. Protestantism at  76.3% is predominant in the Greater Monrovia region and surrounding suburbs and Catholicism at 7.2% is predominant in the Southeastern counties. Islam is practiced by 12.2% of Liberians and is predominant among the Mandingo ethnic group as well as many members of the Vai and Mende ethnic groups. Traditional beliefs such as Voodoo or Juju have a stronghold in the more rural counties but is still practiced even among Christians and Muslims. The religious statistics for Liberian Americans however tend to be more Christian or irreligious.

Politics 
Liberian Americans are actively involved in lobbying the federal government, supporting freedom and democracy in Liberia. They also have organizations that support various issues affecting Liberia, such as humanitarian assistance, wildlife and nature preservation, and women's rights.

Notable Liberian-Americans
 Timothy Weah
 Nathan Biah (born 1971), member of the Rhode Island House of Representatives since 2021
 Wilmot Collins (born 1963), mayor of Helena, Montana since 2018; refugee of the First Liberian Civil War
 Kwity Paye (born 1998), Indianapolis Colts player
 Joe Ragland (born 1989), American-Liberian basketball player for Hapoel Holon of the Israeli Basketball Premier League
 Naquetta Ricks, member of the Colorado House of Representatives since 2021

See also 

 Little Liberia, Staten Island
 American Colonization Society
 Liberia–United States relations

References

Further reading
 Liebenow, J. Gus. Liberia: The Evolution of Privilege (Cornell University Press, 1969).
 Lubkemann, Stephen C. "Diasporicity and Its Discontents: Generation and Fragmented Historicity in the Liberian Transnational Field." Diaspora: A Journal of Transnational Studies 18.1 (2009): 208-227. excerpt
 Ludwig, Bernadette. “Liberians: Struggles for Refugee Families.” in One out Of Three: Immigrant New York in the 21st Century, edited by Nancy Foner,  (Columbia University Press, 2013) pp 200–222.
 Ludwig, Bernadette. "It is tough to be a Liberian refugee in Staten Island, NY: the importance of context for second generation African immigrant youth." African and Black Diaspora 12.2 (2019): 189-210 online.
 Reilly, Janet E.  “Temporary Refugees: The Impact of US Policy on Civic Participation and Political Belonging among Liberians in the United States.” Refugee Survey Quarterly (2016) 35#3 94–118.
 Wells, Ken R. "Liberian Americans." Gale Encyclopedia of Multicultural America, edited by Thomas Riggs, (3rd ed., vol. 3, Gale, 2014), pp. 91–100. online

West Africans in the United States